Carindale bus station is located in Brisbane, Australia serving the suburb of Carindale and Westfield Carindale. It was first used on 11 March 1991, being officially opened on 1 July 1991.

The station serves as a regional transport hub with services connecting to many major destinations including Brisbane City, Redland City, Brisbane Airport (DFO), the University of Queensland and Griffith University. Carindale is also a stop for the Great Circle Line bus routes which connect several major shopping centre destinations around Brisbane. For special events, shuttle buses travel from the bus station to major sporting venues such as the Gabba and Lang Park.

Station Features
The station in its present location was constructed as part of renovations to the neighbouring Carindale shopping centre in the 1990s. Subsequent renovations to the station have included minor improvements, such as the addition of electronic passenger information displays, improved CCTV surveillance and tactile paving as well as changes to access between the bus station and the shopping centre.

The station is under cover but is not enclosed or air-conditioned. It is configured in two platforms - the inner being adjacent to the shopping centre and the outer being an island exposed to Carindale Street.  One stop was removed from the original configuration to make way for a centrally-located pedestrian crossing between the two platforms. A holding stand and bus turning bay is located on the opposite side of the street. Stops A and B provide facilities for articulated buses, although no buses of this type currently service the station.

The station is also the terminus of a Personalised Public Transport (PPT) taxi service operated by the Brisbane City Council. The PPT route operates independently of the TransLink system and services areas of Carindale Hills which do not have a dedicated bus service.

No dedicated public parking facilities are provided, and in July 2012 Westfield introduced paid parking as a means of discouraging commuter parking within the shopping centre.

Eastern Busway
The station will be nearby the proposed Carindale busway station to be built on the Eastern Busway.

No specific date has been announced for commencement of construction, however, since the opening of the first sections of the Eastern Busway in 2009 and 2011, many routes servicing the Carindale bus station now travel via the completed sections of the Eastern Busway.

References

External links
Carindale Bus Interchange TransLink

Bus stations in Brisbane
1991 establishments in Australia